The 1982 City of Lincoln Council election took place on 6 May 1982. This was on the same day as other local elections. One third of the council was up for election: the seats of the  second-highest polling candidates at the all out election of 1979. The Labour Party gained control of the council from the Conservative Party.

Overall results

|-
| colspan=2 style="text-align: right; margin-right: 1em" | Total
| style="text-align: right;" | 11
| colspan=5 |
| style="text-align: right;" | 25,973
| style="text-align: right;" |

Ward results

Abbey

Birchwood

Boultham

Bracebridge

Carholme

Castle

Longdales

Minster

Moorland

Park

Tritton

References

1982
1982 English local elections
1980s in Lincolnshire